Alisa Vetterlein (born 22 October 1988) is a German former football goalkeeper, who played for various teams in the Bundesliga. She is the older sister of Laura Vetterlein.

As an under-19 international she won the 2007 U-19 European Championship. She was included into the tournament's all-star team.

References 

1988 births
Living people
People from Rheinfelden (Baden)
Sportspeople from Freiburg (region)
German women's footballers
SC Freiburg (women) players
1. FFC Frankfurt players
VfL Wolfsburg (women) players
Women's association football goalkeepers
Footballers from Baden-Württemberg
TSG 1899 Hoffenheim (women) players